Earle Harry Decker (September 3, 1864 - ?) was a Major League Baseball catcher. Walker was born on September 3, 1864 in Lockport, Illinois. He played four seasons in Major League Baseball, with the Indianapolis Hoosiers, Kansas City Cowboys, Detroit Wolverines, Washington Nationals, Philadelphia Phillies and Pittsburgh Pirates. Decker's primary position was catcher, but he also played outfield, first base, second base, third base and shortstop. SABR (Society for American Baseball Research) says Decker is credited by many as the inventor of the catcher's mitt. He also served time in San Quentin Penitentiary, California, and a picture of him on the jail baseball team survives. It is unknown where he went from there, receding into the mists of history. As is the case with approximately 200 other 19th century ballplayers, the date of his death is unknown.

References

External links

Philadelphia Phillies players
Indianapolis Hoosiers (AA) players
Kansas City Cowboys (UA) players
Washington Nationals (1886–1889) players
Detroit Wolverines players
Pittsburgh Pirates players
Major League Baseball catchers
Baseball players from Illinois
1864 births
19th-century baseball players
Year of death missing
Evansville (minor league baseball) players
Kansas City Cowboys (minor league) players
Macon (minor league baseball) players
Toronto Canucks players
New Haven Nutmegs players
People from Lockport, Illinois
Sportspeople from the Chicago metropolitan area
People convicted of forgery